De Fructibus et Seminibus Plantarum, also known by its standard botanical abbreviation Fruct. Sem. Pl., is a three-volume botanic treatise by Joseph Gaertner. The first volume was published in December 1788. The second volume was published in four parts, in 1790, 1791, 1791 and 1792 respectively. A third volume was published after Gaertner's death by his son Karl Friedrich von Gaertner from 1805 to 1807; this final volume is also known as 'Supplementum Carpologicae', abbreviated as Suppl. Carp.. Most of the illustrations for the work were done by Johann Georg Sturm (1742-1793).

De Fructibus was based on specimens of over a thousand genera, including Australian and Pacific specimens from the collection of Sir Joseph Banks, and South African specimens from the collection of Carl Peter Thunberg. It was essentially a study of fruits and seeds, but the resultant classification was outstanding for its time.

Julius von Sachs claimed that the work "forms an epoch in the history of botany", writing

References

External links
 De Fructibus et Seminibus Plantarum at Google Books
 De Fructibus et Seminibus Plantarum at Internet Archive

1791 books
Botany books
1780s in science
1790s in science